The Hessel is a river in Germany.

Hessel may also refer to:
Hessel (given name)
Hessel (surname)
Hessel, Michigan, a town in Clark Township, Michigan, United States
Alte Hessel, a tributary of the Hessel in Gütersloh district, North Rhine-Westphalia
Hessel (North Denmark Region) a farm in Denmark, that have much history 
Hessel (singer) (born 1955), Dutch singer

See also 
Eric Hessels, Canadian physicist
Jean Hessels (1522–1566), Belgian theologian
Willem Hessels van Est (1542–1613), Dutch Catholic commentator on the Pauline epistles